The following is a comprehensive listing of releases by Showbread.

Albums

Studio albums

EPs

Compilation Appearances

B-sides

Demos

Other

DVDs

Music videos

References

Discographies of American artists
Rock music group discographies